The 1996 Chilean telethon was the 14th version of the solidarity campaign conducted in Chile.  It took place on 6 and 7 December 1996. The theme of this version was "Another step forward."

After the shortcomings of the previous year, mistakes were corrected and this time the goal was achieved - an important objective, as the following year (1997) the campaign would not be run because of Chilean parliamentary elections - and collected CL$5,692,426,301 (counting from 00:32 hours on December 8) delivered at the National Stadium of Chile. The poster girl on that occasion was Nicole Núñez.

This edition was famous for the slogan "Identify with the Telethon", which was also the name of the official theme song of this edition sung by Don Francisco and a group of local singers. For reasons still unclear, this song was never released as a single.

The build-up
After the perceived failure of the previous Telethon, this was a time of change for the campaign, starting with a change of logo, dropping the classic typeface from 1978. Also, during the preceding campaign, television programmes had on their sets a board saying "(Name of the program) identifies with Telethon", and on the back the guests stamped their fingerprint and signature, confirming their commitment to the campaign.

The fundraising target was simply to exceed the amount raised in the previous year, i.e. $5,534,774,829.

The event
As usual, the event began at the Teatro Teletón with some moving words from Mario Kreutzberger, in which he spoke about the campaign and then sang the Telethon theme with a children's choir. The first section featured artists such as Ricardo Montaner, Illapu, Dinamita Show and Alberto Plaza. In addition Ciclodance were introduced; they had appeared on the show since 1990. The first section concluded with a summary of the previous season's campaign.

In the small hours there was an act called Risatón, where a group of comedians such as Alvaro Salas, Ricardo Meruane and Bombo Fica gathered on stage. Then came the so-called Bailetón (danceathon), from the city of Concepción, directed by Rafael Araneda, Cristian Velasco and Laura Silva.

At dawn came the section called "Waking Women" by Felipe Camiroaga and Kike Morandé, with celebrities like Ivan Valenzuela, Fernando Solabarrieta and the winner Felipe Viel.

By the close of the show at the Theatre, the amount raised came to CL$3,566,320,945. There followed an hour during which the television channels separated to broadcast their respective newscasts.  Then began the final section, in the National Stadium, with a performance of the Ode to Joy by José Alfredo Fuentes, who that year celebrated the 30th year of his career . There were appearances by artists including Proyecto Uno, Enrique Iglesias, Marcos Llunas, Ednita Nazario and El General.

It was surprising was that at 23.36 hours, the compere Kike Morandé was hoping that the total would exceed 5 billion pesos. The count yielded the surprising figure of $5,083,326,540, which meant that the goal would soon be reached.

Later, the final total emerged, bringing joy to all the entertainers and the crowd at the stadium: CL$5,692,426,301. Closing the event, Don Francisco showed his gratitude to all those who had helped, and closed the event with its official theme song.

The rise of a song 
During the final section of the show, at the National Stadium in Santiago, something notable took place when Jorge Hevia, one of the presenters, realized that part of the audience chanted ¡Vamos chilenos!, a song used by Chilean football fans to encourage their national team. The host of the programme Buenos días a todos (Eng.: Good morning everybody) on TVN began to sing the song. Then Don Francisco sang the song in his own way and almost magically the lyrics of a jingle emerged. It has since accompanied the Telethon and in general all Chileans and in later years would become the unofficial anthem of the Chile national football team:

"Vamos, vamos chilenos, que esta noche, lo vamos a lograr"
(Eng.: Come on, come on Chileans, tonight we are going to succeed)

That night after the Telethon achieved its goal the song was:

"Vamos, vamos chilenos, que esta noche, la meta se logró"
(Eng.: Come on, come on Chileans, tonight the goal was achieved)
"Gracias, gracias chilenos, que esta noche, la meta se logró"
(Eng.: Thank you, thank you Chileans, tonight the goal was achieved)

Totals by time

Sponsors

Artists

Chilean singers 
  Illapu
  Banda San Andrés
  Sonora Palacios
  Luis Jara
  Los Grillitos de Graneros
  Cristóbal
  Nicole
  Cecilia Echenique
  El Monteaguilino
  Ariztía
  Keko Yungue
  Inti-Illimani
  
  Wildo
  La nueva ola
  Carlos González
  Miguel Zabaleta
  Alberto Plaza
  Buddy Richard
  José Alfredo Fuentes

Singers from other countries 
   Ricardo Montaner
  Adrián y Los Dados Negros
  Tropi Match
  Las Primas
  Ángela Carrasco
  La Sonora Dinamita
  Pancho y la Sonora Colorada
  Fobia
   Paolo Meneguzzi
  Los Delfines
  José Alonso
  Los Saca Chispas
  Ednita Nazario
  Marcos Llunas
  Sergio Dalma
  La Lupita
  El General
  Proyecto Uno
  Enrique Iglesias
  Marco Antonio Solís

Comedians 
 Dinamita Show
 Los Indolatinos
 Revista del Humor
 Patricio Ibarra
 Álvaro Salas
 Pinto, Paredes y Angulo (Eduardo Thompson, Guillermo Bruce and Gilberto Guzmán)
 Paulo Iglesias
 Marcos Charola Pizarro
 Jorge "Chino" Navarrete

Magazine 
 Ciclodanza
 Angel Torres, dancer

Children's Section 
 Cachureos
 Roberto Nicolini
 Professor Rossa

Curiosities 
 During the first hours of the event, the numbers at the top of the totalisator rotated very fast or very slowly, to display whether the donations were accumulating very fast or very slowly.
 Before the start of a chat session prepared by Leo Caprile, Fernando Cordero Rusque, the then Chief of Police, asked Don Francisco to pass over a card indicating a new total raised, and announced a total of CL$1,220,396,645, which was surprising for the early hour of 2.15pm.  This was the first time in 18 years that the total was announced by a police official.  This was followed by the children's section with Ivan Valenzuela, Consuelo Saavedra and Angélica Castro.
 For the first time in a Telethon there was no board showing the current total and the target.  Instead there was a huge screen, composed of multiple monitors, showing the figures in different graphics, as in the entrance of a bank.
 Mario Silva Leiva, better known as "Cabro_Carrera", described as a "drug trafficker", gave CL$3 million to the campaign.

Transmission 
 Telenorte
 Rock & Pop Televisión
 La Red
 UCV Televisión
 Televisión Nacional de Chile
 Megavisión
 Chilevisión
 Universidad Católica de Chile Televisión
 Red Metrópolis Intercom
 Red VTR Cablexpress

References

External links 
 1996 poster
 Fundación Teletón

Telethon
Chilean telethons